Jeffery Michael Donaldson (born April 19, 1962 in Fort Collins, Colorado) is a former defensive back for the Houston Oilers (1984–1989), the Kansas City Chiefs (1990) and the Atlanta Falcons (1991–1993).

In 10 seasons he had 5.5 sacks and 12 interceptions for 87 yards.  He also had 6 punt returns for 35 yards and 6 kickoff returns for 98 yards.

1962 births
Living people
Sportspeople from Fort Collins, Colorado
Players of American football from Colorado
American football safeties
American football cornerbacks
Colorado Buffaloes football players
Houston Oilers players
Kansas City Chiefs players
Atlanta Falcons players